Cresswell is a surname. Notable people with the surname include:

Aaron Cresswell, English footballer
Addison Cresswell (1960–2013), British talent agent
Arthur Cresswell, New Zealand cricketer, brother of Fen Cresswell
Brad Cresswell, American radio broadcaster and former opera singer 
Chanel Cresswell, English BAFTA award-winning actress 
Cresswell Cresswell (1794–1863), English judge and politician
D'Arcy Cresswell (1896–1960), New Zealand poet and memoirist
Daryn Cresswell, Australian rules footballer
Douglas Cresswell (1894–1960), New Zealand historian and broadcaster
Elijah Cresswell (1889–1931), Scottish footballer
Fen Cresswell, New Zealand cricketer
Helen Cresswell, British writer
Ian Cresswell, Australian composer
Lyell Cresswell, New Zealand-born composer based in Scotland
Peter Cresswell, British immunologist
Sir Peter Cresswell (judge), English High Court judge
Richard Cresswell, English footballer
Richard Cresswell (MP) (1688–1743) English Member of Parliament
Thomas Estcourt Cresswell, English Member of Parliament
Tim Cresswell, British geographer 
Warney Cresswell, English former footballer and football manager
William Nichol Cresswell, British-Canadian painter

Gordon Cresswell, fictional character from JAG

See also
Creswell (surname)